Ornipholidotos irwini, the Vane-Wright's glasswing, is a butterfly in the family Lycaenidae. It is found in Ghana, Cameroon and Gabon. The habitat consists of forests.

References

Butterflies described in 1998
Ornipholidotos